United Nations Security Council Resolution 678, adopted on 29 November 1990, after reaffirming resolutions 660, 661, 662, 664, 665, 666, 667, 669, 670, 674 and 677 (all 1990), the council noted that despite all the United Nations efforts, Iraq continued to defy the Security Council.

Details
The United Nations Security Council, invoking Chapter VII of the United Nations Charter, offered Iraq one final chance to implement Resolution 660 (1990) which demanded that Iraq withdraw its forces unconditionally from Kuwait to the positions in which they were located on 1 August 1990, the day before the invasion of Kuwait began.

On 29 November 1990, the Security Council passed Resolution 678 which gave Iraq until 15 January 1991 to withdraw from Kuwait and empowered states to use "all necessary means" to force Iraq out of Kuwait after the deadline. The Resolution requested Member States to keep the council informed on their decisions. This was the legal authorization for the Gulf War, as Iraq did not withdraw by the deadline.

Cuba's position was nuanced as it had voted for or abstained on previous resolutions relating to the Iraqi invasion, but did not support Resolution 678 because of its authorization of "all necessary means."

Resolution 678 was adopted by 12 votes with two opposing (Cuba and Yemen) and one abstention from the People's Republic of China. The authority granted to Member States in this case contrasts with the disputed legality of U.S. actions in the invasion of Iraq of 2003.

Sticks and carrots
The United States government strenuously lobbied governments represented on the UN Security Council, including the Soviet Union, China, Malaysia and Yemen, to support a resolution authorizing UN members states to use "all necessary means" for removing Iraqi forces from Kuwait. China, which had usually vetoed such resolutions authorizing action against a state, abstained in exchange for a promise from the US government that sanctions would be eased, and that the Chinese foreign minister would be received in the White House. Various members of the council were rewarded with economic incentives as a result of their 'yes' vote, and those who initially opposed the resolution were discouraged from voting 'no' with the idea of economic penalties, particularly by the United States. The US successfully obtained a commitment from the Saudi government to provide $1 billion to the Soviets in aid through the winter.

After Yemen voted against the resolution, the US, World Bank and International Monetary Fund halted aid programs to Yemen, and Saudi Arabia expelled Yemeni workers. Following the US government's fruitless effort to persuade the Yemeni government to support the resolution, US diplomats bluntly informed Yemeni officials "That was the most expensive no vote you ever cast"—referring to ceasing more than $70 million of US government foreign aid to Yemen.

Criticism
International law experts, such as Professor Burns H. Weston, have argued that the UN security council resolution set a "dubious precedent" by backing away from the "peaceful and humanitarian purposes and principles" enshrined in the United Nations Charter, a cornerstone of international law. It did this by failing to vest in the UN the responsibility and the accountability for the military force that was deployed to the region but instead allowing the United States to manage world policy essentially in a unilateral manner.

See also
 Gulf War
 Iraq–Kuwait relations
 List of United Nations Security Council Resolutions 601 to 700 (1987–1991)

References

External links
 
Text of the Resolution at undocs.org

 0678
 0678
History of Kuwait
1990 in Kuwait
1990 in Iraq
Gulf War
 0678
November 1990 events